Stolac is an ancient city located in Herzegovina-Neretva Canton of the Federation of Bosnia and Herzegovina, an entity of Bosnia and Herzegovina. It is located in the region of Herzegovina. Stolac is one of the oldest cities in Bosnia and Herzegovina as well as one of the oldest continuously inhabited cities in the World.

Stolac is situated in the area known as Herzegovina Humina on the tourist route crossing Herzegovina and linking the Bosnian mountainous hinterland with the coastal regions of Bosnia and Herzegovina, Dubrovnik, and Montenegro. The road, running from Sarajevo via Mostar, Stolac, Ljubinje, and Trebinje, enables one to reach Dubrovnik in less than 4 hours.

Thanks to the town's favourable natural environment, geological composition, contours, climate, hydrographic and vegetation, Stolac and its area have been settled since antiquity. Its rich hunting-grounds along with other natural benefits attracted prehistoric man, and later the Illyrians, Romans and Slavs, all of whom left a wealth of anthropological evidence.

In 2022, a new modern road consisted of 36 km that connected the heart of Herzegovina with the sea,  Stolac with Neum, was completed. The road helped the development of tourism between Neum, Stolac and Mostar.

History

The area has been settled for at least 15,000 years, as evidenced by the markings in Badanj Cave, which experts have dated 12,000–16,000 BCE. Three kilometres west of Stolac is the Radimlja stećak necropolis, dating back to the 15th and 16th centuries, the mainstream belief says that Daorson is 2500 years old, but some geological studies confirm that the ruins below the site date back 7000 years.

These stećak tombstones are carved with epitaphs, detailed portraits of the deceased, and motifs such as grapevines, hunting scenes and wild animals. Five of the Radimlja tombstones are thought to mark the graves of members of the Hrabren Miloradović Valachian family.

Ali-paša Rizvanbegović (1783–1851), the semi-independent ruler (vizier) of Ottoman Herzegovina from 1833 to 1851, was born in the Begovina neighbourhood of Stolac.

Architecture

Containing, in one small area, unique cultural and aesthetic values, Stolac's historic core is an example of a complex cultural-historical and natural environmental ensemble.

Nine historical layers compose Stolac's architectural ensemble: pre-history, Illyrian-Roman period, the early Middle Ages, advanced and late Middle Ages, Ottoman period, Austro-Hungarian period, and the time of the first and second Yugoslavia. A multitude of various influences on the architecture of the town, in which contrasts and similarities are frequently evident as well as planning and full spontaneity, lend this town a complex image. Despite its unusual history and inclusion into four empires (Roman, Byzantine, Ottoman, and Austro-Hungarian), three kingdoms (Bosnian, Hungarian and Yugoslav), three world's monotheistic religions - Christianity (Orthodox Christianity and Catholicism), Islam, and Judaism, the historical core of Stolac is still a coherent and harmonious cultural-historical monument with individual properties grown together into one ensemble.

During the Yugoslav Wars, a number of monuments were demolished by Croat extremists as part of a campaign of ethnic cleansing, including the town's four mosques, dating from the 16th to 18th centuries, and the Orthodox Church of the Holy Assumption of Christ.

In 2003 the Commission to Preserve National Monuments of Bosnia and Herzegovina designated Stolac Old Town as a National Monument of Bosnia and Herzegovina. Article 3 of that decision provides that “only research and conservation work and rehabilitation and restoration works, shall be allowed to be carried out, including the works aimed at promoting the National Monument” and “no buildings or any temporary and permanent structures shall be allowed to be constructed and erected at the site of the national monument unless their sole purpose is to protect and promote the monument.”

"Way of the Cross" 

During war-time HVO control, city authorities controlled by HDZ BiH decided to build 14 crosses marking the “Stations of the Cross” within Old Town Stolac. They started from the Old Town Fortress, ultimately constructing eight wooden crosses. In 2002, they replaced the first wooden cross with a four-meter high stone cross, despite objections from the Commission to Preserve National Monuments of Bosnia and Herzegovina, which in 2003 designated the whole old town as National Monument. The following year, city authorities started replacing the other wooden crosses with concrete crosses. The Federation Ministry for Spatial Planning ordered the removal of the concrete crosses and the halting of works. This decision has never been implemented.

The saga restarted in 2019 when the Catholic Church Parish Office of St. Elias the Prophet in Stolac decided to build an additional six crosses to complete the “Stations of Cross.” The Stolac Municipal Council greenlighted the project in November. Mayor Boskovic claims the six crosses fall in the second zone of the protected area and do not desecrate the monument and that the municipality has a positive opinion from the Herzegovina-Neretva Canton's Institute for Protection of National Monuments. The new construction commenced in early 2020 but was called off due to the COVID-19 pandemic. In February, the Federation Inspectorate ordered the removal of all 14 cross foundations. Stolac Municipality appealed the decision, and on 16 March the Federation Ministry for Spatial Planning annulled the Inspectorate's decision, stating that the first instance body had “wrongly established the factual situation.” Construction of the six new crosses resumed on 29 June 2020.

Tourist attractions
 Badanj Cave
 Bregava
 Ošanići
 Radimlja

Notable people
Mak Dizdar (1917–1971), poet
Asaf Duraković (1940–2020), physician and poet
Nijaz Duraković (1949–2012), university professor, founder of Social-Democratic Party of Bosnia and Herzegovina, war-time Bosniak member of rotating presidency of Bosnia and Herzegovina
Mustafa Golubić (1889/1891–1941), member of Young Bosnia
Alija Isaković (1932–1997), writer, publicist and playwright
Jazzar Pasha (1720/30s – 1804) converted to Islam and became the Ottoman governor of Sidon (1776–1804)
Muhamed Mehmedbašić (1887–1943), member of Young Bosnia
Ali Pasha Rizvanbegović (1783–1851), administrator of Stolac from 1813 to 1833
Zdravko Šotra (born 1933), film director
Nikola Katić (born 1996), Croatian football player

Demographics

Population

Ethnic composition 
Following the Dayton peace treaty, the territory of the 1991 municipality of Stolac was divided between the municipality of Stolac in the Federation of Bosnia and Herzegovina and the new municipality of Berkovići in Republika Srpska, where most of the Bosnian Serbs from Stolac now reside.

Settlements of Stolac municipality, 1991
Aladinići, Barane, Berkovići, Bitunja, Bjelojevići, Borojevići, Brštanik, Burmazi, Crnići-Greda, Crnići-Kula, Dabrica, Do, Hatelji, Hodovo, Hrgud, Komanje Brdo, Kozice, Kruševo, Ljubljenica, Ljuti Do, Meča, Orahovica, Ošanići, Pješivac-Greda, Pješivac-Kula, Poplat, Poprati, Predolje, Prenj, Rotimlja, Stolac, Strupići, Suzina, Šćepan Krst, Trijebanj, Trusina and Žegulja.

Climate
Climate in this area has mild differences between highs and lows, and there is adequate rainfall year-round.  The Köppen Climate Classification subtype for this climate is "Cfa" (Humid subtropical climate).

See also
 Daorson

References

External links

 https://www.bljesak.info/gospodarstvo/ulaganja/u-sljedecoj-godini-bit-ce-u-potpunosti-zavrsena-cesta-stolac-neum/334129

 
Cities and towns in the Federation of Bosnia and Herzegovina
Populated places in Stolac
National Monuments of Bosnia and Herzegovina
World Heritage Tentative List for Bosnia and Herzegovina